Epigram Books is an independent publishing company in Singapore. It publishes works of Singapore-based writers, poets and playwrights.

History 

Epigram was originally set up in 1991 by Edmund Wee as a design agency. Epigram began the publishing and designing of annual reports before expanding its portfolio into other design directions such as wayfinding, corporate logo branding, and graphic design. The stable of clients under the company includes OCBC Bank, Singapore Airlines, Media Development Authority and CapitaLand.

Epigram has won international awards for their designs of annual reports, including the Hong Kong Design Awards and the Graphis Gold Award for Annual Reports. They are the first company in the world to win the Grand Prix award at the Red Dot consecutively. They then received commissions for commemorative books for agencies such as National Trades Union Congress and Ministry of Foreign Affairs. Epigram continues to provide services such as art direction, publication design, branding, signage and way-finding, and editorial development.

The company Epigram Books, the publishing arm of Epigram set up in 1999, published its first book with mountaineer David Lim’s  Mountain to Climb: The Quest for Everest and Beyond. Epigram Books bore the design and printing costs of the book and sold 5000 copies. Epigram Books was incorporated as a separate entity from the parent company in July 2011.

In 2015, Epigram Books launched a fiction prize, the Epigram Books Fiction Prize, with an award of $20,000, the richest literary award in Singapore. The first edition was won by O Thiam Chin.

In January 2021, Epigram Books which set up its London arm in November 2016, announced it would stop publishing in the United Kingdom in order to shore up its Singapore business amid the COVID-19 slowdown.

Notable publications and reception 
Epigram Books have published a series of cookbooks, under the Heritage Cookbook series. In 2010, they published There’s No Carrot in Carrot Cake, a guide book to Singapore’s street food (or hawker food in colloquial terms). The book sparked off a debate in the media about the need for a culinary school to preserve Singapore’s food heritage.

A short story, Moving Forward, included in the compilation of Andrew Tan’s Monsters, Miracles & Mayonnaise was nominated for an Eisner Award for Best Short Story in 2013. Monsters, Miracles & Mayonnaise is one of the three graphic novels that was published by the company in 2012. Epigram Books is also the first Singapore publishing house to have a comic book nominated for this prize. Another graphic novel, Ten Sticks and One Rice by Oh Yong Hwee and Koh Hong Teng won an International MANGA Award (Bronze) in 2014.

Other than publishing books by debut authors, Epigram Books has also taken to republish books that are out-of-print Singapore classics, such as Jean Tay’s Boom and Everything but the Brain and Goh Poh Seng’s The Immolation. The company has also launched the Cultural Medallion series, where non-English works of Literature award recipients are translated into English. Some of the works include Singai M. Elangkannan’s Flowers at Dawn, Suratman Markasan’s Penghulu and Wong Meng Voon’s Under the Bed, Confusion.

In 2016, Epigram Books was shortlisted for the Bologna Prize for the Best Children’s Publishers of the Year at the 53rd Bologna Children’s Book Fair. The award rewards creative, innovative publishers based on “the editorial projects, professional skills and intellectual qualities of work produced by publishing houses all over the world”. In the same year, Epigram Books won four out of eight prizes at the Singapore Book Awards, including Book Of The Year for Sonny Liew's The Art of Charlie Chan Hock Chye and Best Fiction Title for Amanda Lee Koe's Ministry of Moral Panic.

Epigram Books Fiction Prize 

Launched in 2015, the Epigram Books Fiction Prize has been awarded annually to the best original and unpublished novel in the English language written by a Singaporean citizen, Singapore permanent resident, or Singapore-born writer. The prize remains Singapore's richest literary prize, with the highest prize being $25,000 SGD. The inaugural 2015 Prize was won by O Thiam Chin for his novel Now That It's Over, while the 2016 Prize was won by Nuraliah Norasid for her novel The Gatekeeper and the 2017 Prize to Sebastian Sim for The Riot Act. In 2018, Yeoh Jo-Ann's Impractical Uses Of Cake won, and it was announced that from 2019, the Prize prize will be open to writers from other ASEAN countries, not only Singapore.

In 2020, Malaysian author Joshua Kam won, with his book, How the Man in Green Saved Pahang, and Possibly the World.

In January 2021, two writers – Meihan Boey and Sebastian Sim – were named joint winners of the 2021 Prize. This is the first time two joint winners have won the Prize and the first time an author has won it twice.

Selected works

2015
Winner
Now That It's Over, O Thiam Chin (2016)
Finalists
Death of a Perm Sec, Wong Souk Yee (2016)
Let's Give It Up for Gimme Lao!, Sebastian Sim (2016)
Sugarbread, Balli Kaur Jaswal (2016)

2016
Winner
The Gatekeeper, Nuraliah Norasid (2017)
Finalists
Surrogate Protocol, Tham Cheng-E (2017)
State of Emergency, Jeremy Tiang (2017)
Fox Fire Girl, O Thiam Chin (2017)

2017
Winner
The Riot Act, Sebastian Sim (2018)
Finalists
Sofia & The Utopia Machine, Judith Huang (2018)
Nimita's Place, Akshita Nanda (2018)
9th of August, Andre Yeo (2018)

2018
Winner
Impractical Uses of Cake, Yeoh Jo-Ann (2019)
Finalists
The Movie That No One Saw, May Seah (2019)
The Lights That Find Us, Anittha Thanabalan (2019)
Beng Beng Revolution, Lu Huiyi (2019)
2019

Winner
 How The Man In Green Saved Pahang, And Possibly The World, Joshua Kam (2020)
Finalists
The Java Enigma, Erni Salleh (2020)
A Good True Thai, Sunisa Manning (2020)
The Witch Doctor’s Daughter, Kathrina Mohd Daud (2020)
2020

Winners (Joint)
The Formidable Miss Cassidy, Meihan Boey (2021)
And The Award Goes to Sally Bong, Sebastian Sim (2021)
Finalists
Lovelier, Lonelier, Daryl Qilin Yam (2021)
Kopi, Puffs & Dreams, Pallavi Gopinath Aney (2021)
Blue Sky Mansion, H.Y. Yeang (2021)
2021

Winner
The Accidental Malay, Karina Robles Bahrin (2022)
Finalists
Every School a Good School, Ng Ziqin (2022)
We Do Not Make Love Here, Nisha Mehraj (2022)
Lost Treasure of the Lanfang Republic, Tan Lip Hong (2022)

References

Book publishing companies of Singapore
Publishing companies established in 2011